Psyllatos is a village in the Famagusta District of Cyprus, located 5 km west of Lefkoniko on the main Nicosia-Trikomo highway. It is under the de facto control of Northern Cyprus.

References

Communities in Famagusta District
Populated places in Gazimağusa District